or "Record of Shinra" is an early-Edo period Japanese domainal history. Its two scrolls recount the early history of the Matsumae clan and describe the extension of Wajin influence over Ezo and encounters with the Ainu. The history is named after Shinra Saburō, an alias of Minamoto no Yoshimitsu, from whom the Matsumae clan claimed descent. The original text from 1643 is preserved in private hands in Okushiri and is the earliest extended record of Hokkaidō.

See also
 List of Cultural Properties of Japan - writings (Hokkaidō)
 Koshamain's War

References

External links
 Scroll One
 Scroll Two

Japanese chronicles
History of Hokkaido
Matsumae clan
1643 books
Edo-period history books